Maquinna is an active submarine mud volcano on the Coast of British Columbia, Canada, located  west of Vancouver Island.

Geology
Maquinna is one of the few mud volcanoes documented in the northeast Pacific.

This data suggests the volcano is actively venting warm hydrothermal fluids.

The formation of Maquinna is thought to be high sediment accumulation and horizontal tectonic compression associated with accretionary prism formation adjacent to the west coast of Vancouver Island supporting overpressuring of fluids at depth along the Nootka Fault zone, resulting in the formation of Maquinna.

See also
Volcanism of Canada
Volcanism of Western Canada
List of volcanoes in Canada

References

Active volcanoes
Volcanoes of the Pacific Ocean
Volcanoes of British Columbia
Calderas of British Columbia
Mud volcanoes